Alejandro Saldaña Villaseñor (born 28 March 1950) is a Mexican politician affiliated with the Institutional Revolutionary Party (PRI). He served as the member (deputy) from Michoacán in the LIX Mexican Legislature from 2003 to 2006. He was succeeded by Antonio Soto Sánchez. In 2011, Villaseñor ran as the PRI candidate for the head of the municipal council of La Piedad; he lost to Hugo Anaya Ávila, the PAN candidate.

Villaseñor currently serves as head of the Regional Land Registry Office in the city of La Piedad.

References

1950 births
Living people
Politicians from Michoacán
Institutional Revolutionary Party politicians
Members of the Chamber of Deputies (Mexico) for Michoacán